Ratu Kinijoji R. Maivalili is a Fijian Chief and former political leader.  From 2001 to 2006 he represented the Province of Cakaudrove in the Senate as one of fourteen nominees of the Great Council of Chiefs.  Previously, he sat in the House of Representatives representing the Cakaudrove West Fijian Communal Constituency, which he won in 1999 but lost in 2001.

Reappointed to the Senate in May 2006, he was subsequently elected President of the Senate at its first sitting on 5 June.  Government-nominated Senator Hafiz Khan was elected as his deputy.

References

Year of birth missing (living people)
Living people
Presidents of the Senate (Fiji)
I-Taukei Fijian members of the Senate (Fiji)
I-Taukei Fijian members of the House of Representatives (Fiji)
Soqosoqo ni Vakavulewa ni Taukei politicians
Fijian chiefs
Politicians from Cakaudrove Province